Narlı or Narli may refer to:

Places

Turkey
 Narlı, Balya, Balıkesir Province
 Narlı, Çatak, Van Province
 Narlı, Kale, Denizli Province
 Narlı, Laçin, Çorum Province
 Narlı, Mut, Mersin Province
 Narlı, Pazarcık, Kahramanmaraş Province
 Narlı, Sincik, Adıyaman Province

Iran
 Narli, Ardabil, a village in Kowsar County, Ardabil Province, Iran
 Narli Aji Su, a village in Maraveh Tappeh County, Golestan Province, Iran
 Narli Dagh, a village in Gonbad-e Qabus County, Golestan Province, Iran

See also
 Narlıca, in Hatay Province, Turkey
 Narlıkuyu, in Mersin Province, Turkey
 Narlıq, in the Sabirabad Rayon of Azerbaijan
 Çınarlı (disambiguation)